Charles M. Steinberg (1932  September 17, 1999) was an immunobiologist and permanent member of the Basel Institute for Immunology. He was a former student of Max Delbrück. Notably he hosted Richard Feynman at Caltech when the physicist studied molecular biology, leading Feynman to remark that Charlie was “...the smartest guy I know”. He was instrumental in the discovery of V(D)J recombination, bacteriophage genetics as part of the phage group and co-discoverer of the amber-mutant of the T4 bacteriophage that led to the recognition of stop codons.

The amber mutants discovered by Charles Steinberg in collaboration with Richard Epstein provided a unique opportunity to study the function of virtually all the genes of phage T4 that are required for growth of the phage under laboratory conditions.  The circumstances under which the amber mutants were discovered was described by Edgar in a retrospective article.  Soon after their discovery, the phage amber mutants, initially characterized by Steinberg and Epstein, were made available to many other investigators.  These mutants were used to obtain important insights into fundamental aspects of biology.  The amber mutants contributed to our understanding of the functions and interactions of the proteins employed in DNA replication, DNA repair, genetic recombination and the assembly of viruses from their molecular components.

See also 

Frank Stahl
Basel Institute for Immunology

References 

1932 births
1999 deaths
American biologists
Genetics
Immunology
20th-century biologists